Valdis Ķuzis (born 14 April 1945) is a Latvian luger. He competed in the men's doubles event at the 1976 Winter Olympics.

References

1945 births
Living people
Latvian male lugers
Olympic lugers of the Soviet Union
Lugers at the 1976 Winter Olympics
Sportspeople from Riga